Blas Tardío de Guzmán (fl. 1740s) was a Bolivian criollo composer, one of four notable criollo students of Juan de Araujo. He succeeded Juan Guerra y Biedma as chapelmaster, maestro de capilla, of the Cathedral of Sucre, then called La Plata, in 1745.

Works, editions, and recordings
 El monstruo de los jardines

References

Bolivian composers
Male composers